A composite number is a positive integer that can be formed by multiplying two smaller positive integers. Equivalently, it is a positive integer that has at least one divisor other than 1 and itself. Every positive integer is composite, prime, or the unit 1, so the composite numbers are exactly the numbers that are not prime and not a unit.

For example, the integer 14 is a composite number because it is the product of the two smaller integers 2 × 7. Likewise, the integers 2 and 3 are not composite numbers because each of them can only be divided by one and itself.

The composite numbers up to 150 are:
4, 6, 8, 9, 10, 12, 14, 15, 16, 18, 20, 21, 22, 24, 25, 26, 27, 28, 30, 32, 33, 34, 35, 36, 38, 39, 40, 42, 44, 45, 46, 48, 49, 50, 51, 52, 54, 55, 56, 57, 58, 60, 62, 63, 64, 65, 66, 68, 69, 70, 72, 74, 75, 76, 77, 78, 80, 81, 82, 84, 85, 86, 87, 88, 90, 91, 92, 93, 94, 95, 96, 98, 99, 100, 102, 104, 105, 106, 108, 110, 111, 112, 114, 115, 116, 117, 118, 119, 120, 121, 122, 123, 124, 125, 126, 128, 129, 130, 132, 133, 134, 135, 136, 138, 140, 141, 142, 143, 144, 145, 146, 147, 148, 150. 

Every composite number can be written as the product of two or more (not necessarily distinct) primes. For example, the composite number 299 can be written as 13 × 23, and the composite number 360 can be written as 23 × 32 × 5; furthermore, this representation is unique up to the order of the factors. This fact is called the fundamental theorem of arithmetic.

There are several known primality tests that can determine whether a number is prime or composite, without necessarily revealing the factorization of a composite input.

Types

One way to classify composite numbers is by counting the number of prime factors. A composite number with two prime factors is a semiprime or 2-almost prime (the factors need not be distinct, hence squares of primes are included). A composite number with three distinct prime factors is a sphenic number. In some applications, it is necessary to differentiate between composite numbers with an odd number of distinct prime factors and those with an even number of distinct prime factors. For the latter 

(where μ is the Möbius function and x is half the total of prime factors), while for the former

For a number n with one or more repeated prime factors,

.

If all the prime factors of a number are repeated it is called a powerful number (All perfect powers are powerful numbers). If none of its prime factors are repeated, it is called squarefree. (All prime numbers and 1 are squarefree.)

For example, 72 = 23 × 32, all the prime factors are repeated, so 72 is a powerful number. 42 = 2 × 3 × 7, none of the prime factors are repeated, so 42 is squarefree.

Another way to classify composite numbers is by counting the number of divisors. All composite numbers have at least three divisors. A number n that has more divisors than any x < n is a highly composite number (though the first two such numbers are 1 and 2).

Composite numbers have also been called "rectangular numbers", but that name can also refer to the pronic numbers, numbers that are the product of two consecutive integers.

Yet another way to classify composite numbers is to determine whether all prime factors are either all below or all above some fixed (prime) number. Such numbers are called smooth numbers and rough numbers, respectively.

See also

 Canonical representation of a positive integer
 Integer factorization
 Sieve of Eratosthenes
 Table of prime factors

Notes

References

External links 
 Lists of composites with prime factorization (first 100, 1,000, 10,000, 100,000, and 1,000,000)
 Divisor Plot (patterns found in large composite numbers)

 Composite
Integer sequences
Arithmetic
Elementary number theory